West Cottage Dome is a granite dome in the Tuolumne Meadows area of Yosemite National Park. West Cottage Dome is rarely visited, though it the closest dome to Daff Dome.

On West Cottage Dome's particulars

See also East Cottage Dome, which is quite close.

West Cottage Dome has a few rock climbing routes.

References

External links and references

 Note on one rock climbing route
 Note on another rock climbing route

Granite domes of Yosemite National Park